Lachante Paul (born 6 August 2002) is an English professional football forward who plays for Leicester City of the FA WSL.

Paul is from London and began playing for the Arsenal W.F.C. Academy. In 2018–19 she scored 15 goals in 15 games for Arsenal's WSL Academy team, and scored twice in the FA WSL Academy Cup final win over Manchester United. She made her first team debut for Arsenal in a FA Women's League Cup fixture in December 2018.

In June 2019, Paul transferred to Leicester City. She scored six times in 19 appearances during a 2019–20 season which was curtailed by the COVID-19 pandemic, then struck seven goals in 25 games in 2020–21 as the club secured promotion to the FA WSL. She was among nine Leicester players to be awarded a new contract with the club ahead of their maiden top flight campaign in 2021–22.

References

External links

2002 births
Women's association football forwards
Women's Super League players
English women's footballers
Arsenal W.F.C. players
Footballers from Greater London
Living people
Leicester City W.F.C. players
Women's Championship (England) players